The Watchman Catholic Charismatic Renewal Movement (WCCRM) also known as Voice of the Last Days Ministry, is an international Christian Pentecostal church located in  Nigeria with her headquarters in Lagos. The movement  was founded in 1985  by Pastor Aloysius Chukwuemeka Onyenemelitobi Ohanebo, the General Superintendent of WCCRM. with over fifty thousand members nationwide  The movement  has numerous branches all over Nigeria, in several parts of Africa, the Middle East, Europe, United Kingdom, Canada and the United States of America.  The Watchman Catholic Charismatic Renewal Movement is: a place where God has placed His name, His Spirit and power, a place of encountering the Lord, revelation knowledge, worship of God in spirit and in truth and where stones are turned into pillows. The word “Catholic” in our name is used in its original sense, i.e., “universal” or “for all”   The movement is taxed with prosecuting the Second Exodus (mass movement of men from diverse errors and ungodly practices to the liberating truth of the gospel of Christ)  through the unique vision and mission that God has given to the General Superintendent tagged "The Lord's 3-Fold End-Time Project"

Mission and Vision 
The unique and urgent 3-Fold End-Time Project that the Lord has given to the WCCRM include:

 Raising a great army of Christians from the various denominations for an imminent great harvest of souls into the Kingdom of God
 Bringing about a great harvest of souls proper as well as a great revival in the entire church 
 Fulfilling the pre-rapture necessity (See Ephesians 4: 11-15; 5:27) 

The Watchman Catholic Charismatic Renewal Movement are executing this wonderful vision through her annual programs and various media. One of the prominent programs through which this vision is being executed is the International Gospel Ministers' Conference (IGMC), a non-denominational conference designed  to gather many ministers of the gospel – pastors, evangelists, church leaders, missionaries, and other Church workers who convoke from Nigeria and several parts of the world to hear about God’s Three-fold End-time Project, which He revealed to Pastor Ohanebo for today’s Church in order to prepare the church for the return of the Master and Saviour, Jesus Christ who is coming again  through The Rapture. It was inaugurated in November 2000 at Lagos, Nigeria and the conference has spread across the globes over the decades.   

Another prominent convention, the Internal Ministers' Conference is an annual conference where all the ministers and workers of WCCRM to listen to the General Superintendent, reiterating the vision of the Watchman as well as planning strategies for its execution. It holds every January    

The Watchman also holds an annual December retreat tagged "Mount Horeb "  where sound truths and biblical principles are taught to help Christians grow and continue in their faith in Christ. It holds all over the world in different locations where the branches are found. 

The ministry has mapped out special days of activities through which the needs of the congregation are met, also fulfilling the unique vision which the Lord has given her. The weekly activities hold thrice weekly: Sundays, Tuesdays and Thursdays.

Watchman World Mission 
The Watchman World Mission is  gospel missionary arm of Voice of the Last Days Ministry, raised as a means of being a channel of salvation to the ends of the Earth. The Watchman World Missions is taxed with recruiting volunteer missionaries  to different parts of the world where there are dire needs. Also, the church through the mission employs pastors and ministers in locations where they are in need, extending and fulfilling the 3-Fold End-Time Project.

Official Details 
http://wccrmvoice.org/

Location: NO. 35, Tafawa Balawa Crescent, Surulere, Lagos, Nigeria

Office Hours 8:00AM - 6:00PM

References 

Churches in Lagos
Evangelical megachurches in Nigeria
Charismatic denominations